Bryobium queenslandicum, commonly known as the dingy urchin orchid, is an epiphytic or lithophytic clump-forming orchid that has cylindrical, fleshy green pseudobulbs, each with two leaves and between three and twelve small, self-pollinating, cream-coloured or pinkish flowers.  This orchid only occurs in tropical North Queensland.

Description
The flowers are cup-shaped, self-pollinating and hairy on the outside. The side lobes are erect and the middle lobe turns downward with two ridges near the base. Flowering occurs from August to October.

Taxonomy and naming
The dingy urchin orchid was first formally described in 1948 by Trevor Edgar Hunt who gave it the name Eria queenslandica and published the description in The North Queensland Naturalist. The type specimen was collected by John Henry Wilkie who collected in on Mount Bellenden Ker. In 2002 Mark Clements and David Jones changed the name to Bryobium queenslandicum.

Distribution and habitat
Bryobium queenslandicum grows on trees and rocks in rainforest between the McIlwraith Range and the Tully River.

References

queenslandicum
Orchids of Queensland
Plants described in 1948